Olive Hill is a historic plantation house located near Matoaca in Chesterfield County, Virginia.  It was built in 1740, and is a two-story, five-bay-wide, white frame house in the Georgian style. The original structure measures . It is sheathed in molded weatherboard and topped by a pedimented roof.  The interior features a Chinese lattice stair with a molded hand rail.

It was listed on the National Register of Historic Places in 1975.

References

Plantation houses in Virginia
Houses on the National Register of Historic Places in Virginia
Georgian architecture in Virginia
Houses completed in 1802
Houses in Chesterfield County, Virginia
National Register of Historic Places in Chesterfield County, Virginia